The 2008 Tulane Green Wave football team represented Tulane University during the 2008 NCAA Division I FBS football season. Tulane competed as a member of the Conference USA.

The team was led by second-year head coach Bob Toledo. Tulane finished the season with a 2–10 record. Despite this, sports columnist King Kaufman declared the Green Wave the national champions. In a Salon article, meant more to point out the flaws in the Bowl Championship Series (BCS) than make a real argument in Tulane's favor, he wrote:
"Tulane beat Louisiana-Monroe, who beat Troy, who beat Middle Tennessee, who beat Maryland, who beat Wake Forest, who beat Mississippi ... [who beat BCS champions] Florida ... [and] also beat Texas Tech, who beat Texas, who beat [BCS runners-up] Oklahoma."

Schedule

References

Tulane Green Wave
Tulane Green Wave football seasons
Tulane Green Wave football